Glenn Holt, Jr. (born July 31, 1984) is a former American football wide receiver. He was signed by the Cincinnati Bengals as an undrafted free agent in 2006. He played college football at Kentucky.

Holt was also a member of the Minnesota Vikings, Detroit Lions and California Redwoods.

College career
Holt started 24 games for the Kentucky Wildcats, totaling 88 career receptions for 810 yards and six touchdowns. He also scored two rushing touchdowns. In 2004, he was named the team MVP for catching 49 passes for 415 yards with three touchdowns on the year, including the only two touchdowns in Kentucky's 14-13 comeback win over Vanderbilt. As of January 2011, Holt traded in his cleats for a clip board as he has returned to his alma mater as a Graduate Assistant Coach..

Professional career

Cincinnati Bengals
Holt signed with the Cincinnati Bengals as an undrafted free agent on May 9, 2006. He then was moved to the practice squad, but finally re-signed to the team.

Holt made his NFL debut against the Carolina Panthers in 2006. His first career catch was for three yards against the Cleveland Browns, also had a kickoff return for 28 yards in that game. Against the Denver Broncos, Holt recorded a team-long 38 yard kickoff return. Against the Pittsburgh Steelers, Holt downed a Kyle Larson punt on the Pittsburgh one-yard line.

In his sophomore season of 2007, Holt played in the second game of the season against the Cleveland Browns. In that game, he recorded 5 receptions for 52 yards and a touchdown. In Week 9 against the Buffalo Bills, Holt returned a kickoff 100 yards for a touchdown in the 2nd quarter. It is the second longest kickoff return in Cincinnati Bengals history. Holt finished the season in with 16 receptions for 143 yards and a touchdown.

On March 24, 2008, the Bengals re-signed Holt who was an exclusive rights free agent to a one-year contract. A restricted free agent in the 2009 offseason, Holt was not tendered a contract offer by the Bengals.

Minnesota Vikings
Holt was signed by the Minnesota Vikings on March 18, 2009. He was waived on August 27.

Detroit Lions
Holt was claimed off waivers by the Detroit Lions on August 28, 2009. He was waived on September 2.

UFL
On October 12, Holt signed with the California Redwoods of the UFL.

Legal issues
In January 2020, Holt was working as Antonio Brown's trainer and involved in an altercation with a delivery driver. Holt was arrested and charged with burglary and battery.

References

External links
Just Sports Stats
Minnesota Vikings bio 
United Football League bio

1984 births
Living people
North Miami Senior High School alumni
Players of American football from Miami
American football wide receivers
American football return specialists
Kentucky Wildcats football players
Cincinnati Bengals players
Minnesota Vikings players
Detroit Lions players
Sacramento Mountain Lions players
Sports coaches from Miami